Wattisfield is a village and civil parish in the Mid Suffolk district of Suffolk in eastern England. Located on the A143 around seven miles south-west of Diss, in 2005 its population was 440, increasing to 475 at the 2011 Census.

The village name in Domesday Book is Watesfelda, derived from the Old English meaning Wastel's clearing. It is situated in the ancient hundred of Blackbourne.

Its medieval church is dedicated to St. Margaret.

Due to the abundant source of mica clay the village has a tradition of pottery making going back to the Bronze Age and there is still a commercial pottery called Watsons which has a factory shop open to the public.
A Romano-British or Anglo-Saxon cemetery was found in 1934 by Basil Brown, who later rose to fame for his discoveries at Sutton Hoo.

The village once had three licensed pubs but now it has none. The Royal Oak was part of Whitbread's pub estate but closed in 1968 and was sold on as a private dwelling, which it remains today directly opposite the church of St. Margaret's. The white post outside the building is a vestige of the old pub sign which used to hang from it. The White Swan was built in the 17th century and closed early 20th century; the building remains as a farmhouse to the north of the A143. The Black Swan closed in the 1920s but the building remains as a private dwelling on the south of the A143 near its junction with Calkewood Lane.

A post-Medieval post mill stood near Manning's Lane; it was demolished circa 1965.

The Post Office and general store closed in 1997 and the building is currently occupied by a ladies hair stylist.

A stream which rises to the south of the village is called The Grundle and is one of the tributaries of the Little Ouse river which eventually joins the Great Ouse and discharges into The Wash.

Several dates during the summer months see motocross scrambling action in the grounds of Wattisfield Hall.

References

External links

Wattisfield Community Centre & Recreation Ground website
Parish Council website
Wattisfield Church

Villages in Suffolk
Civil parishes in Suffolk
Mid Suffolk District